Stenaelurillus mirabilis is  a jumping spider species in the genus Stenaelurillus that lives in Tanzania. It was first described in 2000 from examples found in the Mkomazi National Park. The species name is derived from the Latin for wonderful.

References

Spiders described in 2000
Fauna of Tanzania
Salticidae
Spiders of Africa
Taxa named by Wanda Wesołowska